"Chicken Fried" is a song by American country music group Zac Brown Band, which frontman Zac Brown co-wrote with Wyatt Durrette. The song was first recorded in 2003 for the 2005 album Home Grown. A second version was then released in 2006 by the Lost Trailers, whose version was released as a single but withdrawn from radio. Two years later, the Zac Brown Band re-recorded the song and released it as the first single from their album The Foundation. In late 2008, it became their first chart single, as well as their first number-one hit on the Billboard country charts.  The song was featured in the 2008 film Witless Protection.

The song has also been placed at number 39 for the Taste of Countrys "Top 100 Country Songs of All Time" chart.

History
Brown began co-writing "Chicken Fried" with Wyatt Durrette several years before the song's release. The two met when Brown was playing at a tavern in Atlanta, Georgia. According to Country Weekly magazine, Brown had already started the song, when he and Durrette began listing off "things that are very southern or characteristic of the South to put into this song." The song was completed gradually over several years. After the September 11, 2001 terrorist attacks, Brown decided to add the third verse, which has a patriotic theme ("I thank God for my life / For the stars and stripes…"). Although he had already begun performing the song, he still considered it unfinished until he added a line to the second verse. The patriotic theme and southern cuisine was the band's inspiration to record this song.

The Zac Brown Band first recorded "Chicken Fried" in 2003 and later included this version on their self-released 2005 album Home Grown. Later on, in 2006, The Lost Trailers covered the song as their first release for the BNA Records label, with Blake Chancey serving as producer. Although The Lost Trailers' version had entered the country charts, it was soon withdrawn from radio and replaced with "Call Me Crazy", as Brown had changed his mind about licensing the song to BNA. "Call Me Crazy" then went on to peak at 43 in mid-2006.  In the Nashville episode of Sonic Highways, Zac Brown explained the situation in greater detail:  

In 2008, the Zac Brown Band re-recorded "Chicken Fried" for their fourth album, The Foundation, which Keith Stegall produced. This re-recording was then released in mid-2008 as the band's first single, reaching Number One on the country charts in late 2008.

In 2009, Alan Jackson revealed that he was planning to record the song shortly before the Zac Brown Band version was released, but declined because he felt that he had too many other songs that mentioned food.

On some radio stations, the lyric "Turn the radio up" was changed to say the station name or branding instead. Examples includes KNCI in Sacramento, where the lyric was changed to "KNCI up", and stations branded as The Bull, where the lyric was changed to "Turn The Bull on up".

Commercial performance
The Lost Trailers' version of the song reached as high as #52 on the Hot Country Songs chart in 2006 before being withdrawn as a single. The Zac Brown Band's version made its debut at #59 on the same chart for the week of June 28, 2008, peaking at #1 on the chart week of December 6. This song also made the Zac Brown Band the first country music group to reach Number One with a debut single since Heartland's 2006 Number One hit "I Loved Her First". The song reached 4 million in sales in the United States by October 2013. As of July 2017, the song has sold 4,913,000 copies in the United States.

An Applebee’s TV advertisement featuring this song was aired in CNN while covering Russia’s military deployment across the border of Ukraine the night of February 24, causing controversy. Applebee's eventually pulled its advertising from CNN in response to the incident.

Charts and certifications

Zac Brown Band's version

Weekly chart

Year-end charts

Sales and certifications

The Lost Trailers version

References

2003 songs
2006 singles
2008 debut singles
The Lost Trailers songs
Zac Brown Band songs
Songs written by Zac Brown
Songs written by Wyatt Durrette (songwriter)
Atlantic Records singles
Song recordings produced by Keith Stegall
BNA Records singles
Song recordings produced by Blake Chancey